Martin Ivanič (born 6 February 1981, in Bratislava), better known by his stage name Bacil, is a Slovak rapper, currently cooperating mainly with fellow Slovak rapper Rakby. He is a former member of the group Drvivá Menšina. In 2018 he released his first solo album Poézia Ulice.

Discography

Studio albums (solo)
2008: Poézia Ulice (Poetry of street)
2010: SuperB
2010: Remixes
2011: Streettape (mixtape) (feat DJ Metys)

Studio album (with Rakby)
2012: Abnormal

Singles

References

External links
 
 

1981 births
Living people
21st-century Slovak male singers
Slovak rappers